Baljinder Kaur is an Indian politician and member of the Punjab Legislative Assembly (MLA) representing Talwandi Sabo Assembly constituency. She is a member of the Aam Aadmi Party.

Personal life
Kaur did her M. Phil. from Punjabi University, Patiala in 2009. Before entering politics she was a professor of English at Mata Gujri College at Fatehgarh Sahib. She married Sukhraj Singh in February 2019; he is also a politician from Aam Aadmi Party.
She has one daughter.

Political career
In 2011 Kaur joined the Indian anti-corruption movement and in 2012 joined Aam Aadmi Party. The first time she contested bypoll election from Talwandi Sabo Assembly constituency in 2014 but lost the election.

Member of Legislative Assembly

First term (2017-2022)
She was elected as the Member of Legislative Assembly in the 2017 election she defeated Jeetmohinder Singh of Shiromani Akali Dal with a margin of 19,293 votes.

In the 2019 Indian general election in Punjab she was declared the candidate from Bathinda Lok Sabha constituency by the party. However she lost the election and stood at third place.

She was the president of the women's wing of AAP Punjab.
Committee assignments of 15th Punjab Legislative Assembly
Member (2020–21) Committee on Government Assurances
 Member Library Committee
 Member Committee on Subordinate Legislation

Second term (2022-present)
The Aam Aadmi Party gained a strong 79% majority in the sixteenth Punjab Legislative Assembly by winning 92 out of 117 seats in the 2022 Punjab Legislative Assembly election. MP Bhagwant Mann was sworn in as Chief Minister on 16 March 2022.
Committee assignments of 16th Punjab Legislative Assembly
Chairperson (2022–23) Committee on Questions & References

Electoral Performance for Punjab Assembly

References

  

 

1986 births
Living people
Punjab, India MLAs 2017–2022
Aam Aadmi Party politicians from Punjab, India
Punjabi University alumni
Punjab, India MLAs 2022–2027